Desperation Boulevard is a 1998 American film written and directed by Greg Glienna.

Plot
An ex-child star attempts to get back on top in Hollywood.

Cast 
 Lauren Alexander as Young Judy
 Jim Bruce as Stalker
 Charlene Cher 
 Emmy Collins as Homeless Pizza Thief
 Alex DeVorak as German Man
 Sean Dorgan as Abortion Protester
 Greg Glienna as Director at Audition
 Joey Gyondla as Pizza Delivery Guy
 Bill Jenkins as Coco the Clown (as William B. Jenkins Jr.)
 Ken Kleiber as Guy, The Waiter
 Amber J. Lawson as Mother in Park
 Michael Lerner 
 Leah Stanko Mangum as Fan
 Jeff McLaughlin as Fan with Book
 Lanko Miyazaki as News anchor
 Erin Moran as Self
 Ken Osmond as Self
 Emo Philips
 Paul Tuminaro as Sean Dorgan

References

External links

1998 films
American independent films
American comedy films
1990s English-language films
1990s American films